Amanita vaginata, commonly known as the grisette or the grisette amanita, is an edible mushroom in the fungus family Amanitaceae. Unlike many other Amanita mushrooms, A. vaginata lacks a ring on the stem. The cap is gray or brownish,  in diameter, and has furrows around the edge that duplicate the gill pattern underneath. It has a widespread distribution in North America, and is thought to be part of a species complex that includes other similar-looking Amanitas.

Description 
The gills are white, free (not attached to the stem) to narrowly attached, moderately crowded together, and sometimes have a grayish tint; the lamellulae (small gills that run from the edge of the cap towards the stem) are truncate. The flesh is white and thin, and does not change color upon bruising or injury. Unlike many other Amanitas with stems that are swollen at the base (bulbous), the thickness of the A. vaginata stem is roughly the same at both ends. The stem surface is covered with a finely powdered bloom (pruinose), especially near the top; faint longitudinal lines may be seen. The base of the stem is enclosed in a loose, sack-like volva that may discolor grayish or reddish brown. The spore print is white.

The variant A. vaginata var. alba is pure white, and has a volva that is either absent, or not constricted around the base of the stem.

Microscopic features 
The spores are roughly spherical, 8–12 μm in diameter, thin-walled, and nonamyloid (that is, not absorbing iodine stain in Melzer's reagent). The pileipellis (cap cuticle) is composed of filamentous interwoven hyphae, 2–7 μm diameter, gelatinized. The spore-bearing cells, the basidia, are 36–52 by 4–13 μm, 4–sterigmate, without clamps. The volva is largely made of filamentous hyphae, 2–8 μm diameter, inflated cells broadly elliptic, elliptical, fusiform, to clavate, 40–85 by 10–35 μm, mostly terminal. The stem tissue is made up of filamentous hyphae with diameters of 2–6 μm; the inflated cells are terminal, club-shaped, longitudinally oriented, with dimensions of up to 289 by 31 μm.

Similar species 
The tawny grisette (Amanita fulva) was once thought to be a variety of A. vaginata. In North America, A. vaginata is considered to be part of a species complex, that includes A. constricta, A. pachycolea and A. protecta.

Edibility 
Although not poisonous, most authors advise against consumption due to the possibility of mistaking other poisonous species of Amanita for it. One source notes that the species is usually regarded as edible but may cause intoxication.
One field guide notes that cows enjoy eating this mushroom.

Habitat and distribution 
A mycorrhizal species, Amanita vaginata grows singly or numerous in both coniferous and hardwood forests. It has also been noted to occur frequently in grassy areas at the edge of forests, unkempt lawns, and suburban area where the ground has been recently disturbed. A widely distributed and common species, it fruits from the spring to the fall.

This species is widely distributed in North America. It is also found in the Azores, Australia, Iran  and Scotland.

References

External links 
 Index Fungorum Synonyms
 Pictures and description

vaginata
Edible fungi
Fungi of North America
Fungi of Australia
Fungi of Europe